Roderic Dunkerley (July 20, 1884 – May 6, 1966) was an English minister and Christian writer. Born in Bedford Park, Ealing, West London, he was the son of William Arthur Dunkerley ( John Oxenham). The novelist Elsie J. Oxenham was his sister, as was Erica Oxenham, the biographer of their father, who gives brief details of his early life within the pages of those biographies. He married and had children, and was a Congregational minister.

Books
The Great Awakening (1915)
The Arm of God (1916)
Postman's Knock (1918)
The Proclamation (1920)
The Unwritten Gospel (1925)
First Prayers (1929)
The Pageant of the King's Children (1930) (with his father, John Oxenham)
Treasure Trove (1948)
The Secret Moment (1949)
The Hope of Jesus (1953)
At the House of the Interpreter (1956)
Beyond the Gospels (1957)
Prayer Time in the Junior School (1958) (with his son, Gregor Hamilton Dunkerley)

References

Bibliography
 
 

1884 births
1966 deaths
British Christian writers
Congregationalist writers
Critics of the Christ myth theory